Irrational Anthems is an album by British Folk metal band, Skyclad, released in 1996; their sixth album in as many years. It was their first album without founding member Keith Baxter on drums and longtime guitar player Dave Pugh. The group remained a quartet, with Steve Ramsey overdubbing all guitars, and with the hiring of Paul Smith as session drummer.

The album marked the band's turn to a more folkier sound, moving away from the early years' thrash metal style.

The album title appears as a reference in the closing track "Quantity Time": 
Each moment in your company
was of more quantity than quality.
My hopes and dreams - transparent phantoms,
this wayward son's irrational anthems.

It was released as a digipak and standard CD release.

Track listing
"Inequality Street" – 4:05
"The Wrong Song" – 3:56
"Snake Charming" – 4:04
"Penny Dreadful" – 3:08
"The Sinful Ensemble" – 5:21
"My Mother in Darkness" – 4:00
"The Spiral Starecase" – 2:23
"No Deposit, No Return" – 4:30
"Sabre Dance" – 3:07
"I Dubious" – 3:12
"Science Never Sleeps" – 5:05
"History Lessens" – 3:38
"Quantity Time" – 5:14

References
Encyclopaedia Metalum

1996 albums
Skyclad (band) albums
Massacre Records albums
Albums produced by Kevin Ridley